Richard Courtenay (c. 1655–1696), of Colyton, Devon and Fetcham, Surrey, was an English politician.

He was a Member (MP) of the Parliament of England for Honiton in 1689.

References

1650s births
1696 deaths
Members of the Parliament of England (pre-1707) for Honiton
People from Surrey
English MPs 1689–1690

Year of birth uncertain